The 2012–13 Primeira Liga (also known as Liga ZON Sagres for sponsorship reasons) was the 79th season of the Primeira Liga, the top professional league for Portuguese association football clubs. It began on 19 August 2012 and concluded on 19 May 2013. Sixteen teams contested the league, fourteen of which took part in the previous season and two of which were promoted from the Liga de Honra. Porto were the defending champions and secured their third consecutive and 27th overall title, after completing their second unbeaten season in three years. Porto striker Jackson Martínez was the top scorer with 26 goals.

Teams
A total of sixteen teams contested the league, fourteen of which were present in the 2011–12 Primeira Liga and two of which were promoted from the 2011–12 Liga de Honra. The two relegated teams after the 2011–12 season were Feirense and União de Leiria, which returned to the Liga de Honra after one and three years, respectively, in the top level. Replacing them in the top-flight division were 2011–12 Liga de Honra champions Estoril and runners-up Moreirense, both returning after a seven-year absence. Estoril contested their 21st season in the Primeira Liga, while Moreirense participated only for the fourth time.

Stadia and locations

Personnel and kits

Note: Flags indicate national team as has been defined under FIFA eligibility rules. Players and Managers may hold more than one non-FIFA nationality.

Managerial changes

League table

Positions by round

Results

Season statistics

Top goalscorers

Hat-tricks

Awards

Monthly awards

SJPF Player of the Month

SJPF Young Player of the Month

See also
 List of Portuguese football transfers summer 2012
 List of Portuguese football transfers winter 2012–13

References

Primeira Liga seasons
Port
1